"I Can't Stop My Love for You" (stylized as "I can't stop my love for you♥") is a song by Japanese singer-songwriter Rina Aiuchi. It was released on 10 April 2002 through Giza Studio, as the fifth single from her second studio album Power of Words. The song reached number two in Japan and has sold over 101,880 copies nationwide. The song served as the theme song to the Japanese animated television series, Case Closed.

Track listing
{{Track listing
| headline  = CD single
| extra_column  = Arranger(s)
| total_length  = 

| title1  = I Can't Stop My Love for You
| writer1  = 
| extra1  = Kuuron Oshiro
| length1  = 

| title2  = Pink Baby's Breath
| note2  = 
| writer2  = 
| extra2  = Hiroshi Terao
| length2  = 

| title3  = I Can't Stop My Love for You
| note3  = Kenny's Sublimity Mix
| writer3  = 
| extra3  = Kenny
| length3  = 

| t

Charts

Weekly charts

Certification and sales

|-
! scope="row"| Japan (RIAJ)
| 
| 101,880
|-
|}

Release history

References

2002 singles
2002 songs
J-pop songs
Song recordings produced by Daiko Nagato
Songs written by Rina Aiuchi
Songs written by Daria Kawashima